The Unfinished Spanish Galleon of Finley Lake is the second studio album by Australian rock band Spiderbait, released in 1995. It peaked at No. 14 on the ARIA Albums Charts.

The album was named after the real unfinished Spanish galleon built in Spiderbait's home town, Finley, New South Wales, which was a "failed civic beautification project". The galleon had been partly constructed for many years, before being burnt to the water line by an unknown arsonist. It was then rebuilt in its entirety but then burnt down again and now no longer exists.

Reception 

Emma MacDonald of The Canberra Times opined, in October 1995, that "the music is inventive and quite melodic but, be warned, what seems like a nice musical jaunt at first can turn into a thrashing, speaker-blowing experience without the slightest warning." Australian musicologist, Ian McFarlane, felt it "found the band adding a jazzier touch (as on the title track) to the usually frantic, distortion-fuelled thrash-pop style." Jonathan Lewis of AllMusic that it "consisted of short (most songs are under three minutes) blasts of punk-pop. With their buzzing guitars and the strange vocals of lead singer Kram, Spiderbait were a kind of hybrid of the rawer moments of the Pixies and the Muffs, but less melodic than either of those two."

Track listing

Charts

Release history

References 

Spiderbait albums
1995 albums